Monardella breweri is a species of flowering plant in the mint family known by the common name Brewer's monardella.

Distribution
Monardella breweri is endemic to California, where its range extends from the San Francisco Bay Area through the Central Coast Ranges to the Transverse Ranges, including the Santa Monica Mountains, in the Greater Los Angeles Area. Its habitat includes chaparral and oak woodland.

Description
Monardella breweri is a hairy annual herb producing a branching erect stem up to about 65 centimeters in maximum height. The oppositely arranged oval leaves are up to 4.5 centimeters long. The inflorescence is a head of several flowers blooming in a cup of stiff, pointed, veined, purplish bracts up to 3 centimeters wide. Each hairy pinkish five-lobed flower is just over a centimeter long.

External links
 Jepson Manual Treatment - Monardella breweri
 USDA Plants Profile: Monardella breweri
 Monardella breweri - Photo gallery

breweri
Endemic flora of California
Flora of the Sierra Nevada (United States)
Natural history of the California chaparral and woodlands
Natural history of the Peninsular Ranges
Natural history of the Santa Monica Mountains
Natural history of the Transverse Ranges
Taxa named by Asa Gray
Flora without expected TNC conservation status